Sergei Ilyich Yakushev (September 25, 1910 – April 30, 1995) was a Soviet and Azerbaijani actor and Deputy of the 6th–8th convocation of the Supreme Soviet of the Azerbaijan SSR.

Biography 
Sergei Yakushev was born on September 25, 1910, in Astrakhan. He began his stage career in 1931 at the Lensovet Theatre and graduated in 1933 from the State Institute of Theatre Arts (GITIS) in Moscow. 

He served in the Soviet Army from 1934 to 1935. From 1936 to 1948 he worked in the Leningrad, Stalinabad and Irkutsk theaters. From 1948 he worked as an actor at the Azerbaijan State Russian Drama Theater, from 1959 to 1968 as a director, and from 1968 as an actor again.

Sergei Yakushev had been a member of the CPSU since 1942, a deputy of the Supreme Soviet of the Azerbaijan SSR of the 6th–8th convocation, as well as a member of the Commission on Public Education, Science and Culture.

He died on April 30, 1995, in Baku.

Awards 
 People's Artist of the Azerbaijan SSR – June 10, 1959
 People's Artist of the Tajik SSR – April 28, 1945
 Honored Artist of the Tajik SSR – 1939
 Order of the Red Banner of Labour — 1970
 Order of Friendship of Peoples — September 24, 1980
 Order of the Badge of Honour — 1941

References

External links 
 
 

1910 births
1995 deaths
20th-century Azerbaijani male actors
People from Astrakhan
People from Astrakhan Governorate
Members of the Supreme Soviet of the Azerbaijan Soviet Socialist Republic
People's Artists of Azerbaijan
People's Artists of Tajikistan
Recipients of the Order of Friendship of Peoples
Recipients of the Order of the Red Banner of Labour